Nejedlý (feminine Nejedlá) is a Czech surname. Its literal meaning is "inedible". Notable people include:

 Arnošt Nejedlý, Czech athlete
 Jana Nejedly, Czech-Canadian tennis player
 John A. Nejedly, American politician
 Martina Nejedly, Czech-Canadian tennis player
 Oldřich Nejedlý, Czech footballer
 Vojtěch Nejedlý, Czech writer
 Zdeněk Nejedlý, Czech musicologist and communist politician

References

Czech-language surnames